Indonesia following independence from the Netherlands in the 1940s to the Indonesian killings of 1965–66 was subjected to extensive cultural change, and a range of possible political directions suring the Sukarno era.

The emergence of various literary styles in the period 1950-1965 can not be separated from the existence of cultural polemic in Indonesia.

In the midst of an ideological war going on, came the cultural institutions that represent each of the main competing ideologies.

LKN ( National Culture Institute ) represented PNI with ideas of Indonesian nationalism. Lesbumi ( Indonesian Muslim Cultural Arts Institute ) representing the Islamic party with Islamic ideas. LEKRA ( Cultural Institute) represent the PKI with the idea of communism.

Of conflict between cultural institutions, cultural organizations LEKRA appears to be the most dominant in the 1960s. LEKRA move with the slogan " art for the people" and " political chief ". LEKRA embodies the artists who then hooked that LEKRA under the auspices of the PKI . Therefore, LEKRA movement can not be separated from the communist ideology ride led by the PKI .

Through LEKRA maraklah socialist realism literary patterned from a number of authors such as Rival Apin , Hr Bandaharo , Pramoedya Ananta Toer , A.S. Dharta , Bakri Siregar , Tatang Utuy Sontani , S , Anantaguna , Zubir AA , Kusni Sulang , Bachtiar Siagian , Agam Wispi , and Sobron Aidit.

LEKRA success is to capture the cultural artists to side with him . Though unwittingly LEKRA cultural artists make it as a tool for political purposes PKI . LEKRA always stressed the political and moral responsibility of the artist to the people who suffer , but almost never entered the crucial problem , namely how the political and moral responsibility can and should be translated into artistic creations , or in other words how the ideology it must be stated in art.

In addition LEKRA writers are also growing outside writers LEKRA growing in the period 1950s to 1960s . Although no adequate facilities and amid circumstances that are not conducive did not dampen the spirit of the writers out LEKRA to keep writing . Here are the names of the authors are non - LEKRA namely Asrul Sani , AA Navis , Ajip Rosidi , Bur Rasuanto , Djamil Suherman , Gerson Poyk , Kirjomulyo , M. Saribi , Motinggo Busye , Nh . Dini , Nasjah Djamin , Ramadhan KH , Trisnoyuwono , Trisno Sumardjo , Taufiq Ismail , W. S Rendra.

References

20th-century literature
Indonesian literature by era